Nijat Gurbanov (born 17 February 1992) is an Azerbaijani footballer who plays as a right winger for Georgian club Samtredia.

Club career
On 16 February 2012, Gurbanov made his debut in the Azerbaijan Premier League for Simurq match against Gabala.

References

External links
 

1992 births
Living people
Association football midfielders
Azerbaijani footballers
Azerbaijani expatriate footballers
Expatriate footballers in Georgia (country)
Azerbaijan Premier League players
Erovnuli Liga players
Neftçi PFK players
Simurq PIK players
AZAL PFK players
Zira FK players
Kapaz PFK players
Sumgayit FK players
Sabail FK players
FC Samtredia players